Estonia competed at the 1936 Winter Olympics in Garmisch-Partenkirchen, Germany.  The nation returned to the Winter Games after missing the 1932 Winter Olympics.  These Games would be the last time that Estonia would compete at the Winter Games as an independent nation until the 1992 Winter Olympics.  After the nation was annexed by the Soviet Union in 1940, Estonian athletes would compete at the Olympic Games as part of the USSR delegations.

Alpine skiing

Cross-country skiing

Figure skating

Speed skating

References

External links
 EOK – Garmisch-Partenkirchen 1936 

Nations at the 1936 Winter Olympics
1936
Olympics, Winter